James MacFarlane (17 July 1866 – 11 December 1942) was a New Zealand cricketer. He played first-class cricket for Canterbury and Otago between 1887 and 1896.

See also
 List of Otago representative cricketers

References

External links
 

1866 births
1942 deaths
New Zealand cricketers
Canterbury cricketers
Otago cricketers
Cricketers from Dunedin